Iain MacKintosh (20 July 1932 – 28 August 2006, Glasgow, Scotland) was a Scottish singer and songwriter.

Early life
MacKintosh' father was from the Outer Hebrides, a watchmaker and goldsmith who owned a pawnshop in Glasgow; his mother came from Northern Ireland. At age seven he started learning the Highland pipes. He played in a pipe band in his youth. His mother died when he was twelve, and he and his three sisters were brought up by his grandmother. After grammar school, he started his working life as an apprentice watchmaker and goldsmith and later took over his father's business. After serving in the British Army in the Near East he married Sadie; the couple had two daughters, Isla and Fiona.

Career 
In the late 1950s MacKintosh went to a Pete Seeger concert in Glasgow. He was so impressed he bought a banjo and started to practise. His other instrument of choice was the concertina. He joined the nascent Scottish folk music revival. In 1960 he formed his first band The Islanders, with whom he made one album. It contained one of the first songs he wrote; the Pawn Song drew on his experiences in the business. For the next ten years he played in two more bands, The Skerries and The Other Half, and was in demand as a session musician for the likes of Hamish Imlach, Gaberlunzie and Watt Nicoll.

In 1970 MacKintosh went professional as a solo singer, accompanying himself on the long-necked banjo, and also playing the pipes or the concertina. For thirty years he toured Europe, the United States and Australia. His repertoire had always ranged beyond traditionals. He took most of his material from other songwriters, with Harry Chapin and Glaswegian Adam McNaughtan as particular favourites. Scottish audiences voted him Scotland's "Folk Musician of the Year" several times. Of his self-penned songs, 'I Wouldn't Change A Thing', an account of his career in five verses, is probably the most popular; he recorded it for Stage By Stage.

MacKintosh became one of the best-loved artists of Tønder Festival where he used to run the Saturday afternoon concert at the Mill. For years he did joint tours with other notable folk artists, mainly Hamish Imlach and Brian McNeill. He retired at the age of 68, after a final tour of several European countries in 2000.

Iain MacKintosh died on 28 August 2006 of laryngeal cancer, weakened by Parkinson's disease.

Discography

Sources
Sing Out!, 1 January 2007
Kalweit, Susanne: I Wouldn't Change A Thing! 40 years of Iain MacKintosh, from 'The Living Tradition', issue 49 (Sept/Oct 2002), pp 38–39, 60
McVicar, Ewan: One Singer One Song. Old and new stories and songs of Glasgow folk, Glasgow 1990
Siniveer, Kaarel: Folk Lexikon, Reinbek b. Hamburg 1981

References

External links
 I Wouldn't Change A Thing!

20th-century Scottish male singers
Scottish songwriters
Scottish folk musicians
1932 births
2006 deaths
Deaths from cancer in Scotland
Deaths from laryngeal cancer
People with Parkinson's disease
20th-century Scottish male musicians
British male songwriters